St. Francis Regional Medical Center is a not-for-profit regional medical center located on the southwestern edge of the Twin Cities metropolitan area in Shakopee, Minnesota. St. Francis was founded by a small group of Franciscan Sisters in 1938 and is currently owned by Allina Health, HealthPartners Park Nicollet and Essentia Health.

Hospital rating data
The HealthGrades website contains the latest quality data for St. Francis Regional Medical Center, as of 2016. For this rating section three different types of data from HealthGrades are presented: quality ratings for eighteen inpatient conditions and procedures, twelve patient safety indicators and the percentage of patients giving the hospital a 9 or 10 (the two highest possible ratings).

For inpatient conditions and procedures, there are three possible ratings: worse than expected, as expected, better than expected.  For this hospital the data for this category is:
Worse than expected - 0
As expected - 15
Better than expected - 3
For patient safety indicators, there are the same three possible ratings. For this hospital safety indicators were rated as:
Worse than expected - 1
As expected - 11
Better than expected - 0
Percentage of patients rating this hospital as a 9 or 10 - 78%
Percentage of patients who on average rank hospitals as a 9 or 10 - 69%

See also
 List of hospitals in Minnesota

References

External links
 Official site of St. Francis Regional Medical Center
 Official site of Allina Health
 Official site of HealthPartners
 Official site of Essentia Health

Hospitals in Minnesota
Healthcare in Minnesota
Hospitals established in 1938